, released in 1970, is a film made by Japanese director Kōji Wakamatsu.

Plot
Set in the near future, a small gang of revolutionary students are hidden away by a small-time thief. While they are hiding, all but the thief take turns having sex with an unhappy (and perhaps unwilling) girl who has had the misfortune to get involved with them.

About Sex Jack, Kōji Wakamatsu said: "I wanted to show how the revolutionary movements are always infiltrated by the moles working for the government."

References

External links
 IMDb entry
 on the New York Times

1970 films
Films directed by Kōji Wakamatsu
Pink films
1970s pornographic films
1970s Japanese films